Sweetheart of the Sun is the fifth studio album by American pop rock band the Bangles, released on September 27, 2011. It is the band's second album since their 2003 reunion, and their first as a trio after the departure of longtime member Michael Steele. The twelve-song album was co-produced by the Bangles and Matthew Sweet.

Background
Sweetheart of the Sun is only the fifth full-length studio album by the Bangles since the band's inception thirty years earlier. It came eight years after their initial reunion album, Doll Revolution (2003). That record had been followed by an extensive concert tour after which bassist Michael Steele left the group, and a lengthy period of readjustment ensued. The remaining trio tried out new bassists and toured sporadically. Eventually they focused on making a new album on their own – the process would take about two years to complete.

Susanna Hoffs attributed the long process to parenting and family responsibilities. In an interview she said: 

The album's name comes from the song "Anna Lee (Sweetheart of the Sun)", which was inspired by the book Girls Like Us (2009) by Sheila Weller. The triple biography tells the intertwined stories of the Laurel Canyon-based singer-songwriters Carole King, Joni Mitchell, and Carly Simon. The book had a deep impact on Hoffs, and she passed it along to Vicki and Debbi Peterson who also loved it. The song conveys the influence these musicians had on the Bangles, both in their music and as role models of independent feminist women.

The song's opening lines – "Got a picture of you sittin', In the kitchen without a stitch on, Beautiful and natural as can be" – were inspired by a particular passage in the book. Hoffs explained:

Compositions
Of the album's twelve songs, ten are original compositions by some combination of the three band members (with occasional outside collaborators, including the former Go-Go's guitarist Charlotte Caffey); three songs are credited to the full trio itself. In addition to new material expressly written for the album, some of the songs were selected from a trove of unrecorded songs stretching back many years; a few date back as far as the early 1990s. The album's two cover songs date back even farther, to the 1960s: "Sweet and Tender Romance" is a reworking of a 1964 single by the UK girl group the McKinleys, while "Open My Eyes" comes from Todd Rundgren's early psychedelic band, the Nazz.

Releases 
The album was officially released on September 27, 2011. An expanded version of the album was released exclusively through Barnes & Noble stores and included acoustic versions of "Through Your Eyes" and "What a Life" as bonus tracks.

Reception
The album was seen by many critics as a successful reinvention of the Bangles' early musical style – "a beautifully sustained salute to 1960s-inspired pop". Writing in The New York Times, music critic Jon Caramanica remarked that much of the album feels "like mature takes on youthful ideas" and harkens back to the Bangles EP of 1982 and the band's earliest days. Similarly, Steve Pick of Blurt stated that "it sounds remarkably like what we might have expected a follow-up to All Over the Place to be".

Addressing the album purely on its own terms, Fresh Airs music critic Ken Tucker gave it a wholly favorable review, saying: "The greatest accomplishment of this new album is that it's never necessary to have heard a single Bangles song before right now to appreciate the craft and cleverness of the music they're making. Good pop-rock conquers all time and space."

Track listing

Personnel
The band's musical credits are described in the album's liner notes:The BanglesSusanna Hoffs – vocals, electric guitar, percussion
Debbi Peterson – vocals, drums, percussion, acoustic guitar on "Ball N Chain" and "One of Two"
Vicki Peterson – vocals, electric guitar, acoustic guitar on "Circles in the Sky", "Lay Yourself Down", "One of Two", and "What a Life",  12-string guitar on "Anna  Lee", "Mesmerized", "What a Life" and "Through Your Eyes", slide guitar  on "Ball N' Chain", percussionAdditional musicians Derrick Anderson – bass guitar
 Matthew Sweet – bass guitar on "Through Your Eyes"
 Greg Leisz – mandolin, pedal steel guitar, lap steel guitar, electric guitar
 Greg Hilfman – piano, keyboards
 Jim Scott – keyboards
 John Cowsill – harmony vocals on "Circles in the Sky"Production'
 The Bangles – producer
 Matthew Sweet – producer

Charts

References

External links
 
 
 

The Bangles albums
2011 albums
Albums produced by Matthew Sweet